Hericium novae-zealandiae, also known as pekepeke-kiore is a species of edible saprobic fungus endemic to New Zealand.

Found growing on rotten logs in forests, it has traditional applications in rongoā medical practices. It can be cultivated, with cultures and grow kits available commercially in New Zealand.

References

External links

Fungi of New Zealand
Edible fungi
Fungi in cultivation
Fungi described in 2019
Russulales